"In da Wind" is a song by American rapper Trick Daddy. Released as the first single from his fifth studio album Thug Holiday (2002), it features guest appearances from rappers Big Boi and Cee Lo Green and was produced by Jazze Pha, who helped to write the song alongside the three rappers.
It was later sampled in the Collipark remix of Britney Spears and the Ying Yang Twin's "(I Got That) Boom Boom".

Track listing 
 CD single
 "In da Wind" (featuring Big Boi and Cee Lo Green) – 4:20

 Digital download
 "In da Wind" (featuring Big Boi and Cee Lo Green) – 4:20

 12" single
 "In da Wind" (featuring Big Boi and Cee Lo Green) – 4:20

Credits and personnel
The credits for "In da Wind" are adapted from the liner notes of Thug Holiday.
Recording
 Recorded at: Stankonia Recording in Atlanta, Georgia.

Personnel
 Trick Daddy – songwriting, vocals
 Big Boi – songwriting, vocals
 Cee Lo Green – songwriting, vocals
 Jazze Pha – production, songwriting
 John Frye – recording, mixing
 Malik Albert – recording
 Warren Bletcher – recording assistant
 Brian "Big Bass" Gardner – mastering

Charts

Weekly charts

Year-end charts

References 

2002 singles
2002 songs
Trick Daddy songs
Big Boi songs
CeeLo Green songs
Songs written by Trick Daddy
Songs written by Big Boi
Songs written by CeeLo Green
Atlantic Records singles